Doyt L. Perry (January 6, 1910February 10, 1992) was an American football player, coach, and college athletics administrator. He served as head football coach at Bowling Green State University from 1955 to 1964, compiling a record of 77–11–5, and then became the athletic director for the university. During his tenure as coach, Perry led the Bowling Green Falcons to five Mid-American Conference titles and one small college national championship in 1959. One of the most successful coaches in school history, Perry was elected to College Football Hall of Fame in 1988. The team's football stadium, Doyt Perry Stadium, is named in his honor. Doyt Perry resigned from Bowling Green State University in January 1971 to serve at Florida International University for two years until retirement.

Before coming to Bowling Green, Perry was a backfield coach at Ohio State University from 1951 to 1954, serving on the same staff as Woody Hayes and Bo Schembechler. He coached the 1954 Buckeyes, who won the 1955 Rose Bowl and a national championship. Perry was also the head coach at Upper Arlington High School in Upper Arlington, Ohio in 1943 and from 1946 to 1950.

Head coaching record

College

References

External links
 
 
 Doyt Perry: A Coach For Life, WBGU-PBS documentary

1910 births
1992 deaths
Bowling Green Falcons athletic directors
Bowling Green Falcons baseball players
Bowling Green Falcons football players
Bowling Green Falcons football coaches
FIU Panthers athletic directors
Ohio State Buckeyes football coaches
High school football coaches in  Ohio
College Football Hall of Fame inductees
People from Licking County, Ohio